Dumonde may refer to:

DuMonde, a German Trance duo
Lee DuMonde and Renée DuMonde, fictional characters on the television soap opera Days of our Lives